Gorges du Tarn Causses is a commune in the department of Lozère, southern France. The municipality was established on 1 January 2017 by merger of the former communes of Sainte-Enimie (the seat), Montbrun and Quézac.

See also 
Communes of the Lozère department

References 

Communes of Lozère